Zanda Zakuza, also known as Zanda “Dragon” Zakuza is a South African house and kwaito singer and songwriter. Born and raised in Umlazi, she achieved widespread popularity after featuring on the singles "Skeleton Move" by Master KG and "Club Controller" (2019) by Prince Kaybee.

Life & career
Zakuza was born and raised in Durban, KwaZulu-Natal but her family are from Bizana in the Eastern Cape.

She attended Pinetown Girls’ High School and later enrolled at the University of KwaZulu-Natal, where she studied music, specialising in jazz. Zanda left in her second year to pursue a music career; she, however, later returned to college to study business management and human resources.

At her early age she preferred dancing and sports then later engage in music while in high school. During events when she performed,  people at the event mostly shed tears due to the type of soul she always performed with.

Music career 
After dropping out of university she made it clear that she spent a while without a job but before she was successful in music.
She joined the industry in 2015 and  signed a record deal with Open Mic Productions. On May 25, 2018, She released her debut studio album Synthia The Journey, was released. The album describes the life of her mother supporting her music career. The album includes collaboration from Bongo Beats, Spirit Banger, Dr Moruti and Doc Shebeleza. On October 3, 2020, her single "Khaya Lam"  featuring Master KG and Prince Benza was released.

On September 24, 2021, her single  "Afrika"  featuring Mr Six21 DJ, Bravo De Virus and Fallo SA was released. She received nominations for Best Female Artist in South Africa at All Africa Music Awards.

Tours

Co-headlining 
 Jerusalem  Live Concert (2021) (with Master KG)

Discography

Studio albums
 Synthia The Journey (2018)

Awards and nominations

References

People from KwaZulu-Natal
Living people
21st-century South African women singers
University of KwaZulu-Natal alumni
1993 births